Vikhammer is a village in the municipality of Malvik in Trøndelag county, Norway.

The villages of Hundhammeren, Vikhammer, Saksvik (all in Malvik), and Væretrøa (in Trondheim) together form an urban area called Malvik. This area is the most populous urban area in the municipality.

Vikhammer is a center of tourism each summer, with many German and Swedish camping tourists who camp at Vikhammer Camping. Tourists come to see the fjords for which Norway is famous.  Locally, the salmon fishing is also a popular tourist activity.  The European route E6 highway runs just south of the village. The Vikhammer Station on the Nordland Line is located in the village.  Malvik Church is located just east of the village.

The village is called "Vikhammer" because it was historically a Viking village. There is also a park in Vikhammer called "Vikhov park" which got its name because the Vikings had their houses in that area.

References

External links
 Vikhammer Camping 

Villages in Trøndelag
Malvik